Langlands is a rural locality in the Western Downs Region, Queensland, Australia.

Geography 
The locality is bounded loosely by Canaga Creek to the north, Canaga Creek Road to the west, Lower Jinghi Road to the south and Carlishs Road and Gadsbys Road to the east.

The predominant land use is crop growing.

The Chinchilla–Wondai Road runs along the northern boundary.

History
Langlands State School opened on 18 April 1922. It closed on 29 January 1962. It was at 1033 Langlands Hall Road.

Economy 
There are a number of homesteads in the locality:

 Elouera
 Langlands
 Pleasant View
 Ponderosa
 Torquay

Education 
There are no schools in Langlands. The nearest primary schools are Burra Burri State School in Burra Burri to the north and Jandowae State School in Jandowae to the south-east. The nearest secondary school is Jandowae State School which provides secondary schooling to Year 10. For schooling to Year 12, the nearest secondary school is Chinchilla State High School in Chinchilla to the west.

References 

Western Downs Region
Localities in Queensland